Vengo is Chilean hip hop artist Ana Tijoux's fourth solo studio album, released in March 2014. Its debut single "Vengo" was released on Spin in January of the same year. Vengo was nominated for a Grammy Award for Best Latin Rock, Urban or Alternative Album at the 2015 Ceremony.

Reception

Critical response

A reviewer at NPR called it "virtually flawless", and MTV said it was "some of the most dazzling hip-hop this year".

Several reviewers noted the inclusion of Andean music elements, especially the pan flute. NPR's reviewer said it was "refreshing" and noted Andean music has been "often done a disservice by "world music" labels." Of the flute, the MTV reviewer said "it's a bit challenging to extricate the instrument from its associations with corny new age compilations ... Tijoux is attempting a tough task to take back and breathe new life into music that has a rich heritage, but has been commercialized and marginalized into schlock."

Reviewers also noted the progressive elements of the lyrics, including feminism, environmentalism, social justice and post-colonialism.

The album's instrumentation is completely done with in-studio recordings, often with traditional South American instruments.  Unusually for modern hip-hop recording, there are no samples used on the album. One reviewer said that it contained elements of folk music and jazz.

Awards

Track listing

Charts

References

Notes

Sources

Further reading

2014 albums
Spanish-language albums
Nacional Records albums
Ana Tijoux albums
Political music albums by Chilean artists